This is the all-time medal table of the World Games as of the 2022 edition. In the history of the games, Russia (2001, 2005, 2009 and 2017) has led the total medal count four times, and Italy (1985, 1989 and 2013) three times. The United States have claimed that honor twice (1981 and 1997), while Germany (West Germany in the first three editions) also led the overall count twice in 1993 and in 2022. Ranked by gold, then silver, then bronze:

References

World Games
All time medal table